IS5 or IS-5 may refer to:

 is 5, a 1926 collection of poetry by E. E. Cummings
 IS-5, the Soviet T-10 tank
 Infosec Standard 5, a British IT security standard
 IS-5 Kaczka, a Polish canard research glider

See also
 IS-54, a second-generation mobile phone system